is a Japanese football player who plays as a midfielder for Avispa Fukuoka.

National team career
In October 2013, Sugimoto was elected Japan U-17 national team for 2013 U-17 World Cup. He played all 4 matches and scored a goal against Venezuela. Japan run to the round of 16.

Club statistics
Updated to 6 May 2021.

1Includes Japanese Super Cup, J. League Championship and FIFA Club World Cup.

FIFA U-17 World Cup statistics

References

External links

 
 Profile at Tokushima Vortis
 
 

1996 births
Living people
Association football people from Gifu Prefecture
Japanese footballers
Japan youth international footballers
J1 League players
J2 League players
J3 League players
Kashima Antlers players
J.League U-22 Selection players
Tokushima Vortis players
Matsumoto Yamaga FC players
Association football midfielders